Elections of the Dutch Senate were held on 23 May 2011, following the provincial elections on 2 March 2011. The 566 members of the twelve States-Provincial elected the 75 Senate members. The new Senate was installed on 7 June 2011. The term ended on 8 June 2015.

Participating parties

Vote weights 
The provinces have different population sizes, so the members of the States-Provincial cast weighted votes, to ensure that each vote represents the same number of people. The weight is determined by dividing the population of the province by the number of seats in the States of that province. This number is divided by 100 and rounded.

Result 

The coalition parties VVD and CDA and their supporting party, the PVV, won 37 seats in this election, one short of an overall majority. However, the coalition-friendly SGP won the last needed seat, and it is expected that the SGP will help the cabinet in obtaining a majority on most issues.

- * Democrats 66 missed a seat and the Socialist Party gained one due to a mistake of North Holland States-Provincial member Wim Cool, who voted with a blue writing device instead of the prescribed red one.

References

2011
Senate